The Henry Ford Square House (also known as the Henry Ford Honeymoon House) is a single-family house located at 29835 Beechwood Avenue in Garden City, Michigan.  It was designated a Michigan State Historic Site in 1979 and listed on the National Register of Historic Places in 1980.

History 
Henry Ford and Clara Jane Bryant were married on April 11, 1888.  Soon after, they began construction on this house, then located at the corner of Ford Road and what is now the Southfield Freeway.  Clara drew the plans, specifying the kitchen, sitting room, parlor and bedroom.  Henry built the house himself, using timber cut on the property and finished in the sawmill he operated.  An expert carpenter helped with the fancy-work details, such as the turned balustrades.  The couple moved into the house in about June 1889.  Ford later added a workshop, where he experimented with gasoline-powered engines.

The Fords lived in this house only until September 1891, when they left for Detroit.  However, they retained ownership of the house until 1937, using it as a summer cottage.  Ford gave the cottage to an employee, Robert Smith.  After the Fords died, the land around the house was bought by the Ford Land Development Corporation, who told Smith to move the cottage to make room for freeway expansion; in 1952, it was moved to its present location.  The house was listed on the National Register of Historic Places in 1980.

Description 
The Henry Ford Square House is a 2-story square house, 31 feet on each side, with a mansard roof and clapboard siding.  The center-entrance front facade has a window cap on the second-floor bedroom window.  The interior of the house has a kitchen, dining room, living room, family room, 4 bedrooms, 1 1/2 baths, and a full basement.

References

Houses in Wayne County, Michigan
Houses completed in 1888
Houses on the National Register of Historic Places in Michigan
Michigan State Historic Sites in Wayne County, Michigan
National Register of Historic Places in Wayne County, Michigan
Henry Ford